John Norbert Joseph Muellbauer, FBA (born 17 July 1944) is a British applied economist who is a professor at the University of Oxford.

He holds several positions at Oxford University including an Official Fellowship at Nuffield College and a professorship and senior fellowship at the Institute for New Economic Thinking. He also is a fellow not only of the British Academy, but also of the Econometric Society, the Centre for Economic Policy Research (CEPR) and of the European Economic Association (EEA).

In 2014, Muellbauer wrote a famous call for a 'quantitative easing for people' in the Eurozone.

Selected publications

Deaton, A & Muellbauer, J (1980) Economics and Consumer Behaviour, Cambridge University Press

Deaton, A., & Muellbauer, J. (1980). An almost ideal demand system. The American economic review, 312–326.

References

Fellows of Nuffield College, Oxford
Fellows of the British Academy
1944 births
Living people
Fellows of the Econometric Society
British economists
University of California, Berkeley faculty